Simmasanam is a 2000 Indian Tamil-language drama film directed by Eswaran. The film stars Vijayakanth in a triple role as the father and his two sons. The film also starred Khushbu Sundar, Manthra, Radhika Chaudhari, Ambika and Viji. The film is released on 4 August 2000 and was receiving mixed reviews from the film critics and audience.

Plot
In a remote village, Sakthivel and Thangarasu are stepbrothers. Sakthivel is a man of high values and integrity who has a wife and a son while Thangarasu is a young angry man who cannot tolerate injustice thus getting easily in trouble. The stepbrothers are both respected by the villagers but Sakthivel refuses to even acknowledge Thangarasu as his brother. Meanwhile, Manju and Revathi fall in love with Thangarasu. During a wedding function, some rowdies misbehave with Sakthivel's wife, Manju, and Revathi. Thangarasu has no other choice than to beat them up. At the village court, Sakthivel insults Thangarasu and publicly flogs him. A heartbroken Thangarasu then blames his mother believing that she had killed his father and his grandfather tells him the truth.

In the past, Sathyamurthy was a village chief with a heart of gold who helped the poor. He lived with his shrewish wife Annapoorani and his son Sakthivel. Annapoorni's brothers then brainwashed her: Annapoorni didn't want her husband to help the poor anymore and started to behave harshly towards him. Sathyamurthy slowly distanced himself from Annapoorni and secretly continued to help the poor. Soon, Annapoorni suspected Sathyamurthy of having an affair with the poor village woman Kannamma and Annapoorni even publicly humiliated her. Kannamma then attempted to commit suicide but Sathyamurthy saved her. Sathyamurthy's mother advised her son to marry the innocent Kannamma.

Back to the present, Thangarasu finally meets his mother Kannamma who was living all these years in a special home and he brings her to his village. There, Sakthivel insults Kannamma for killing his father Sathyamurthy. Thangarasu and Sakthivel fight but their grandmother stops it and tells them the truth. That day, Sathyamurthy had eaten poisoned food given by Annapoorni and her brothers and the blame was put on the innocent Kannamma.

Sakthivel eventually apologizes to his stepbrother Thangarasu and his stepmother Kannamma. Annapurna scolds her brothers for killing her husband but they swear that they are innocent. Sakthivel and Thangarasu finally find out the culprit: Thambidurai, a rich zamindar who hated Sathyamurthy for helping the poor. Sakthivel and Thangarasu beat Thambidurai and his henchmen up, and the police arrest Thambidurai for the murder of their father.

Cast

Vijayakanth as Sathyamurthy, Sakthivel, and Thangarasu (triple role)
Khushbu Sundar as Sakthivel's wife
Manthra as Manju
Radhika Chaudhari as Revathi
Ambika as Annapoorani, Sathyamurthy's first wife
Viji as Kannamma, Sathyamurthy's second wife
Radharavi as Annapoorani's brother
Thyagu as Annapoorani's brother
Rajan P. Dev as Thambidurai
Manorama as Sathyamurthy's mother 
Senthil as Kandhasamy
R. Sundarrajan as Kannamma's father
Sethu Vinayagam as Mayilsamy
Raviraj as Velusamy
Naga Kannan as Rowdy
Master Vasanthakumar as Sakthivel's son
Vaiyapuri as Thangarasu's friend
Anu Mohan as Bus driver
K. R. Vatsala as Annapoorani's sister-in-law
Fathima Babu as Annapoorani's sister-in-law
Idichapuli Selvaraj as Kanakku Pillai
K. K. Soundar as  Sakthivel and Thangarasu’s uncle
Kovai Senthil as Villager
Crane Manohar as Villager
Halwa Vasu as Villager
Chelladurai as Villager
Jayamani as Villager
Sharmili as Oomaichi
Dubbing Janaki as Special home worker
Bobby as Rowdy
Karnaa Radha as Veeraiah
Kalyan in a special appearance

Production
The film marked the directorial debut of Eswaran. The filming was held at locations in Chennai, Ooty, Pollachi, Udumalai, and Chalakkudi, among other places. A song was picturised in the lush green valley around Tirumurthy Hills.

Soundtrack

The film score and the soundtrack were composed by S. A. Rajkumar. The soundtrack, released in 2000, features 5 tracks.

Reception
A critic from The Hindu noted "The story is not new but the screenplay which has all the ingredients to sustain the interest of the average viewer, with political overtones in dialogues, has been skillfully woven by director Eswar".

References

2000 films
2000s Tamil-language films
Indian action films
Indian films about revenge
Films scored by S. A. Rajkumar
2000 directorial debut films
2000 action films